Robert Zimmermann Is Tangled Up in Love is a 2008 German comedy film directed by Leander Haußmann.

Cast
 Tom Schilling - Robert Zimmermann
 Maruschka Detmers - Monika
 Christian Sengewald - Ole
 Julia Dietze - Lorna
 James Garfunkel - himself
 Kirstin Hesse - Anka
 Annika Kuhl - Pia Zimmermann
 Detlev Buck - Eberhard
 Peter Jordan - Karsten Darkness
 Leander Haußmann - Ronny

References

External links

2008 romantic comedy films
2008 films
German romantic comedy films
2000s German films